Gorantla Butchaiah Chowdary is an Indian politician representing Rajahmundry Rural constituency in Andhra Pradesh for the Telugu Desam Party (TDP). He has been elected six times as a Member of the Legislative Assembly. He has been a general secretary of the TDP. He served as the cabinet minister for civil supplies. , he lived in Rajahmundry.

References

Andhra Pradesh MLAs 2014–2019
Telugu Desam Party politicians
Living people
Year of birth missing (living people)
Andhra Pradesh MLAs 1994–1999
Andhra Pradesh MLAs 1999–2004
Andhra Pradesh MLAs 2019–2024
Andhra Pradesh MLAs 1983–1985
Andhra Pradesh MLAs 1985–1989
State cabinet ministers of Andhra Pradesh
People from East Godavari district